The coulomb (symbol: C) is the unit of electric charge in the International System of Units (SI). In the present version of the SI it is equal to the electric charge delivered by a 1 ampere constant current in 1 second and to  elementary charges, (about  ).

Name and history

By 1878, the British Association for the Advancement of Science had defined the volt, ohm, and farad, but not the coulomb.  In 1881, the International Electrical Congress, now the International Electrotechnical Commission (IEC), approved the volt as the unit for electromotive force, the ampere as the unit for electric current, and the coulomb as the unit of electric charge.  
At that time, the volt was defined as the potential difference [i.e., what is nowadays called the "voltage (difference)"] across a conductor when a current of one ampere dissipates one watt of power.
The coulomb (later "absolute coulomb" or "abcoulomb" for disambiguation) was part of the EMU system of units. The "international coulomb" based on laboratory specifications for its measurement was introduced by the IEC in 1908. The entire set of "reproducible units" was abandoned in 1948 and the "international coulomb" became the modern coulomb.

Definition
The SI defines the coulomb in terms of the ampere and second: 1 C = 1 A × 1 s. 
The ampere is defined by taking the fixed numerical value of the elementary charge e to be  coulombs. 
The 2019 redefinition of the ampere and other SI base units fixed the numerical value of the elementary charge when expressed in coulombs, and therefore fixed the value of the coulomb when expressed as a multiple of the fundamental charge (the numerical values of those quantities are the multiplicative inverses of each other). 
The ampere was previously defined in terms of two wires of infinite extent.

The exact value of 1 coulomb is

elementary charges where  and the numerator  is a prime number.

It is impossible to realize exactly 1 C of charge, since the number of elementary charges is not an integer. It is also impossible to realize charge at the yoctocoulomb scale.

SI prefixes

Like other SI units, the coulomb can be modified by adding a prefix that multiplies it by a power of 10.

Conversions
One faraday equals  In terms of the Avogadro constant (NA), one coulomb is equal to approximately  × NA elementary charges.
A capacitor of one farad can hold one coulomb at a drop of one volt.
One ampere hour equals 3600 C, hence  = 3.6 C.
One statcoulomb (statC), the obsolete CGS electrostatic unit of charge (esu), is approximately 3.3356 C or about one-third of a nanocoulomb.

In everyday terms
The charges in static electricity from rubbing materials together are typically a few microcoulombs.
The amount of charge that travels through a lightning bolt is typically around 15 C, although for large bolts this can be up to 350 C.
The amount of charge that travels through a typical alkaline AA battery from being fully charged to discharged is about 5 kC = 5000 C ≈ 1400 mA⋅h.
 A typical smartphone battery can hold 10,800 C ≈ 3000 mA⋅h.

See also
Abcoulomb, a cgs unit of charge
Ampère's circuital law
Coulomb's law
Electrostatics
Elementary charge
Faraday constant, the number of coulombs per mole of elementary charges

Notes and references

SI derived units
Units of electrical charge